Walter Sherborne "Sherry" Shourds Jr. (March 15, 1906 – February 13, 1991) was an American assistant director, director  and production manager who was a write-in nomination during the 8th Academy Awards for the short lived Best Assistant Director category for A Midsummer Night's Dream, which was also the 2nd and last year the Academy Awards allowed write-in votes. He also helped on the television show Bonanza

Selected filmography
The Iron Mask (1929)
Captain Blood (1935)
A Midsummer Night's Dream (1935)
Angels with Dirty Faces (1938)Four Daughters (1938)All This, and Heaven Too (1940)The Letter (1940)The Sea Wolf (1941)Kings Row (1942)The Big Punch (1948) (director)I Confess'' (1953) (production manager)

References

External links
 

1906 births
1991 deaths
Artists from Philadelphia
American film directors
American women film directors
20th-century American women